Egg-and-dart, also known as egg-and-tongue, egg-and-anchor, or egg-and-star, is an ornamental device adorning the fundamental quarter-round, convex ovolo profile of moulding, consisting of alternating details on the face of the ovolo—typically an egg-shaped object alternating with a V-shaped element (e.g., an arrow, anchor, or dart). The device is carved or otherwise fashioned into ovolos composed of wood, stone, plaster, or other materials.

Egg-and-dart enrichment of the ovolo molding of the Ionic capital was used by ancient Greek builders, so it is found in ancient Greek architecture (e.g., the Erechtheion at the Acropolis of Athens), was used later by the Romans and continues to adorn capitals of modern buildings built in Classical styles (e.g., the Ionic capitals of the Jefferson Memorial in Washington, D.C., or the ones of the Romanian Athenaeum from Bucharest). Its ovoid shape (the egg) and serrated leaf (the dart) are believed to represent the opium poppy and its leaves. The moulding design element continues in use in neoclassical architecture. As a mass-produced architectural motif at the turn of the 19th to the 20th century, it can, when seen alongside dentils (tooth-like blocks of wood in rows), be used to date a building to the Edwardian period, which began with the death of Queen Victoria in 1901.

Gallery

See also
 Rais-de-cœur
 Ionic order

References

Further reading

External links
 

Ornaments (architecture)
Visual motifs